This glossary of industrial automation is a list of definitions of terms and illustrations related specifically to the field of industrial automation. For a more general view on electric engineering, see Glossary of electrical and electronics engineering. For terms related to engineering in general, see Glossary of engineering.

A

See also 
 Glossary of engineering
 Glossary of power electronics
 Glossary of civil engineering
 Glossary of mechanical engineering
 Glossary of structural engineering

Notes

References

Attribution

External links

Websites 

 Glossary of Industrial Automation
 Automation Glossary of terms
 Glossary of technical terms commonly used by ABB
 An automation glossary
 Glossary - Industrial Electronic/Electrical Terms
 Robotics Glossary: a Guide to Terms and Technologies

PDFs 

 Glossary of Terms used in Programmable Controller-based Systems
 Glossary of Terms for Process Control
 INDUSTRY 4.0: Glossary of terms/buzzwords/jargon

Electrical engineering
Electronic engineering
Industrial automation
Industrial automation
Industrial automation
Wikipedia glossaries using description lists